FC Izumrud-Neftyanik Timashyovsk was a Russian football team from Timashyovsk. It played professionally in 1991 and 1996. Their best result was 10th place in Zone 2 of the Russian Third League in 1996.

Team name history
 1991 FC Kuban Timashyovsk
 1995–1997 FC Izumrud Timashyovsk
 1998 FC Izumrud-Neftyanik Timashyovsk

External links
  Team history at KLISF

Association football clubs established in 1991
Association football clubs disestablished in 1999
Defunct football clubs in Russia
Sport in Krasnodar Krai
1991 establishments in Russia
1999 disestablishments in Russia